Thiruvaalangadu is one of the 32 Saiva temples in Tondai Nadu which have been sung in the devaarams. 
Lord Siva is known as 'Vada aaranyeswarar' in this temple (Vada - meaning north and aaranyam - meaning forest and Eswarar - referring to Lord Siva) His consort here is called 'VaaNdaarkuzhali' (meaning the one whose locks attract beetles - to suck honey from the flowers that decorate it). Thiruvaalangadu also houses the Rathinasabai - which is one of the panchasabais (pancha - meaning five, and sabais meaning stage / dias), for Lord Nataraja. This temple is amongst the greatest Shiva Temples of Tamil Nadu.

Saints Sambanthar has sung one pathigam (a form of poetry), Appar two pathigams and Sundarar one pathigam in praise of the Lord at Thiruvaalangadu. Kaaraikaal Ammaiyar, one of the foremost of the 63 devotees of Lord Siva, who sought and obtained a ghost form and added the signature of 'Kaaraikaal Pei' (the ghost of Kaariakaal) to her poetry, is said to have walked into this place on her head - considering even the soil around too holy to be stepped on. She has composed the famous   'Moothathirupadhigam', the 'Thiruirrattaimanimalai' and the 'Arpudhathiruvandhadhi' in praise of the Lord. Shs attained spiritual bliss and salvation at Thiruvaalangadu and it is believed that she still sits beneath the Lord's feet, singing his glory when He dances.

Lord Nataraja at Thiruvaalangadu is exquisite and captivating. At the Rathinasabai the Lord is seen with his consort, Goddess Sivagami on His right and Kaaraikaal Ammayar singing on his left.

Sri Viswaroopa Panchamukha Hanuman ashram is located at Tiruvallur, next to Tiruvalangadu. A  Sri Panchamukha Hanuman has been installed in this ashram as per mantra shastra.

Notes

Shiva temples in Tamil Nadu